Mark Dalton (born 9 November 1964 in Sydney, New South Wales) is an Australian former basketball player who played in the National Basketball League from 1984 to 1999.

Early life and family
He attended St. Augustine's College in Brookvale, New South Wales. He is the brother of two other Australian basketball players, Brad Dalton and Karen Dalton.

He was an Australian Institute of Sport scholarship holder (1982-1984) and became the first AIS men's player selected to play for Australia at the Olympics.

Career
After finishing at the AIS in 1984, Mark Dalton, a 6'6"(198 cm) tall Small forward, played in the NBL for the Canberra Cannons (1984–1985), Geelong Supercats (1986–1987), Sydney Kings (1988–1995), Brisbane Bullets (1996–1997), and Illawarra Hawks (1998–1999).

On 10 October 2013, Dalton was named in the Sydney Kings 25th Anniversary Team.

International
Dalton represented the Australian Boomers at the 1984 Olympic Games in Los Angeles and at the 1986 FIBA World Championship in Spain.

References

External links
 

1964 births
Living people
Australian men's basketball players
Australian Institute of Sport basketball players
Basketball players at the 1984 Summer Olympics
Basketball players from Sydney
Brisbane Bullets players
Canberra Cannons players
Geelong Supercats players
Olympic basketball players of Australia
Small forwards
Sportsmen from New South Wales
Sydney Kings players
Wollongong Hawks players
1986 FIBA World Championship players
20th-century Australian people
21st-century Australian people